Teak wood is used for making boats, furniture, and other things which require resistance to the elements. Teak is used for outdoor furniture  but is not recommended for full exposure to sunlight. Being more expensive than most other woods, teak furniture has become something of a status symbol. Not only is it common for a teak bench, chair, or table to last 70 years with the correct care plan, it is also common to pass down such furniture to future generations as an heirloom.

Types of teak furniture
Teak is originally from the teak tree with the Latin name Tectona grandis. The teak tree is common in Southeast Asia. Teak is a hardwood that is particularly resistant to different types of climate, making it suitable for shipbuilding and for furniture.
Teak furniture can remain outdoors in any climate year round, and can be left unfinished or protected. Plantation teak wood can be considered eco-friendly due to its long life expectancies. To ensure the reduction of impact teak furniture has to the environment, many forestry companies produce sustainably managed plantation teak.

Tables and dining sets
In places and seasons where eating outdoors is common and pleasant, it is common to find wooden dining tables and chairs in gardens, backyards, deck areas, patios, pool yards and sun rooms. Teak is an excellent material for this application, because it will not be broken down in the sun like plastics, it is less prone to the elements like other woods, it is lighter and cooler than iron, and will not easily bend or break like tubular metals.

Benches
Benches are perhaps the most common use of teak other than marine applications. Teak benches are ideal for commercial use due to their strong nature and natural resistance to decay and termites, and are available in an endless variety of designs.

Chaise loungers
Teak is popular for chaise loungers and other recumbent seating because it is more durable and better crafted than most plastic loungers and will not get hot in the sun like metal loungers. Since these chairs are heavy, they often have 2 or more wheels for easy transport from place to place.

Adirondacks armchairs
Adirondack chairs (also known as Muskoka chairs) are comfortable with their high backs, their contoured seats and their wide arm-rests. The arm-rests provide ample room for food and beverages for comfortable meals while reclining with no table required, making them popular with outdoor cafés and bistros as they offer seating and a small place for food without the need for a table.

Umbrellas
Teak is a popular and traditional wood for the frames of large umbrellas such as shade umbrellas and market umbrellas. While teak provides the durability, weather resistance and lightness needed for such an application, metals like aluminum are more popular and generally a cheaper choice.

Deep seating
Complemented with weather resistant and outdoor cushions and similar to living room furniture, deep seating patio furniture is becoming more and more popular in places with warmer climates. With landscaping and outdoor décor being such a popular trend, furniture to sit in and enjoy the space has followed suit. The teak wood construction allows patio furniture sets to last years longer than other wood furniture.

Teak oil
"Teak oil" is the name used by manufactures of various oil-based wood treatments intended for use on teak and other hardwoods. Teak oil most often contains linseed oil, but does not contain oil from the teak tree.

References

Bibliography
 Business in Indonesia: New Challenges, Old Problems - Google Books
 Border Partial Citizenship, Border Towns, and Thai-Myanmar Cross-border ... - Pitch Pongsawat - Google Books
 Teak furniture and business responsibility : a global value chain dynamics approach (Article, 2006) [WorldCat.org]
 Governing the teak furniture business: A global value chain system dynamic modelling approach (Article, 2009) [WorldCat.org]

Furniture
Wood